Borsalino & Co. is a 1974 French crime film directed by Jacques Deray and starring Alain Delon, Riccardo Cucciolla and Daniel Ivernel. It is the sequel to the 1970 film Borsalino, opening with the criminal Siffredi as he searches Marseille for the gang that murdered his friend Capella.

Plot
Siffredi, a prominent gangster in 1930s Marseille, learns that the murder of his associate and closest friend Capella was ordered by a new arrival in the city, Volpone. In revenge, he kills Volpone's brother by throwing him from a moving train. A gang war ensues. Volpone's men win, capturing Siffredi and putting his mistress Lola in a brothel. Siffredi is humiliated by the gang by turning him into an alcoholic wreck who is shut up in a psychiatric hospital. Rescued by the only other survivor of the gang, he escapes by boat to Italy. Left supreme in Marseille, Volpone is backed by the government of Nazi Germany and has the police in his pocket.

Three years later, Siffredi has recovered his health, made some money and assembled a new gang. Returning to Marseille, they free Lola from the brothel and in a new war eliminate most of Volpone's men. Capturing his right-hand man together with the police commissioner who kowtows to him, Siffredi makes the two roaring drunk and calls in journalists to publicise the shameful spectacle. A new police commissioner decides to let Siffredi finish the job. When Volpone tries to flee to Germany, Siffredi captures him on the train and stuffs him into the firebox of the locomotive. Not wanting to start again in Marseille, with Lola and his gang he then takes a ship for the United States.

Partial cast
 Alain Delon - Roch Siffredi 
 Riccardo Cucciolla - Volpone 
 Daniel Ivernel - Inspector Fanti 
 Reinhard Kolldehoff - Sam 
 André Falcon - Inspector Cazenave 
 Lionel Vitrant - Fernand 
 Adolfo Lastretti - Luciano 
 Greg Germain - Le 'Nègre' 
 Pierre Koulak - Spada 
 Marius Laurey - Teissere 
 Serge Davri - Charlie 
 Günter Meisner - Le médecin 
 Jacques Debary - Le préfet 
 Djéloul Beghoura - Lucien 
 Bruno Balp - Un spectateur de l'Alcazar 
 Catherine Rouvel - Lola
 Anton Diffring - German
 Mireille Darc - Cameo

Production
Filming took place from 29 March to 25 June 1974.

Reception
The film was a box office disappointment, especially considering the success of the first movie.

References

External links

Review at DVD Talk
Borsalino and Co at TCMDB

1970s buddy films
1974 crime films
1974 films
Films about organized crime in France
Films directed by Jacques Deray
Films produced by Alain Delon
Films set in the 1930s
Films set in Marseille
French sequel films
1970s French-language films
French gangster films
Italian gangster films
Italian buddy films
West German films
Films scored by Claude Bolling
1970s French films
1970s Italian films